Bansdih is a town and a nagar panchayat in Ballia district  in the state of Uttar Pradesh, India. The name Bansdih is taken from bans (bamboo). This town has a tehsil, college, school and a market place for nearby many villages. Currently chairman of Bansdih Renu Singh w/o Arvind Singh.

Demographics 
 India census, Bansdih had a population of 20,232. Males constitute 51% of the population and females 49%. Bansdih has an average literacy rate of 53%, lower than the national average of 59.5%; with 62% of the males and 38% of females literate. 17% of the population is under 6 years of age.

See also
Surahia

References 

 Cities and towns in Ballia district